Garrah Tnaiash (born 1 January 1991) is an Iraqi Paralympic athlete of short stature. He represented Iraq at the 2016 Summer Paralympics held in Rio de Janeiro, Brazil and he won the gold medal in the men's shot put F40. In 2021, he won the silver medal in the same event at the 2020 Summer Paralympics held in Tokyo, Japan.

Career 

At the 2015 World Championships held in Doha, Qatar, he won the gold medal in the men's shot put F40 event. Two years later, he also won the gold medal in the same event at the 2017 World Championships held in London, United Kingdom.

At the 2018 Asian Para Games held in Jakarta, Indonesia, he set a new world record of 10.88m in the shot put F40 event.

At the 2019 World Championships held in Dubai, United Arab Emirates, he won the silver medal in the  shot put F40 event. At this event Denis Gnezdilov of Russia threw a distance of 10.88m, the same as Tnaiash's world record.

Achievements

References

External links 
 

Living people
1991 births
Place of birth missing (living people)
Iraqi male shot putters
Athletes (track and field) at the 2016 Summer Paralympics
Athletes (track and field) at the 2020 Summer Paralympics
Medalists at the 2016 Summer Paralympics
Medalists at the 2020 Summer Paralympics
Paralympic athletes of Iraq
Paralympic gold medalists for Iraq
Paralympic silver medalists for Iraq
Competitors in athletics with dwarfism
Paralympic medalists in athletics (track and field)
Medalists at the World Para Athletics Championships